Tobias Hill (born 30 March 1970 in London, England) is a British poet, essayist, writer of short stories and novelist.

Life
Tobias Hill was born in Kentish Town, in North London, to parents of German Jewish and English extraction: his maternal grandfather was the brother of Gottfried Bermann, confidant of Thomas Mann and, as owner of S. Fischer Verlag, German literature's leading publisher-in-exile during the Second World War. Hill's father was a journalist and his mother was a graphic designer.  Hill was educated at Hampstead School and the  University of Sussex before spending two years teaching in Japan. He lives in Cricklewood, north London.

Work

Poetry
Hill's early work appeared in magazines such as Envoi and The Frogmore Papers and published four collections, Year of the Dog (1995),  Midnight in the City of Clocks  (1996) (influenced by his experience of life in Japan) Zoo (1998) and Nocturne in Chrome & Sunset Yellow (2006). The last of these was described by The Guardian as "A vital, luminous collection... it is rare to come across a collection of poetry that you know with certainty you will still be reading years from now, but for me, this is such a book." Hill's collection of short stories, Skin (1997), was serialised on BBC Radio 4, was shortlisted for the 1998 John Llewellyn Rhys/Mail on Sunday Prize, and won the International PEN/Macmillan Silver Pen Award.

Novels
In 1999, Hill published his debut novel, Underground. Set on the London Underground, this dark, neo-gothic work follows the story of Casimir, a Polish immigrant, as he comes to terms with his personal and national past. Underground won the Betty Trask Prize and the Arts Council Writer's Award.

The Love of Stones (2001), Hill's second novel, garnered wider recognition: it charts the lives of two nineteenth-century Jewish brothers and a contemporary protagonist, Katharine Sterne, whose stories are entwined with that of a jewel known as "The Three Brothers", once owned by Elizabeth I, but lost since the 17th century.

Hill's third novel, The Cryptographer, was published in 2003. A sparer narrative than The Love of Stones, it tells the story of a global financial disaster, examining issues of trust and secrecy. The Cryptographer is set in the near future, but comprises a shadow portrait of the enigmatic historical figure John Law. In December 2003 the Hay Festival showcased the novel as its Book of the Year. It was described by the author A. S. Byatt as evidence of "one of the two or three most original and interesting young novelists working in Britain today".

Tobias Hill's fourth novel, The Hidden, was published to acclaim in January 2009. In the Guardian, the author James Lasdun called it "an elaborate mystery along the lines of The Magus or The Secret History, and a sustained meditation on the special ethics of terrorism in ancient and modern times...You don't often see writing as lively as this." The author Kamila Shamsie, in The Observer, wrote: "Apart from everything else that this novel is — a beautifully paced thriller, a meditation on loss, guilt, obsession — it is also one of the finest novels written so far about this, our age of terror."

Other work
Hill has written one book for children, The Lion Who Ate Everything, illustrated by Michael Foreman, twice winner of the Kate Greenaway Medal. He has also written for The Times, The Observer, The Independent, The Guardian and Time Out. From 1998 to 2001, he was the Sunday Telegraph'''s rock 
critic. He has edited the works of other writers, including Edgar Allan Poe In 2012, Hill, along with Brooke Magnanti, acted as a judge for Fleeting Magazine's Six-Word Short Story Prize.

Critical perspective
Amongst contemporary British authors, Hill is unusual in achieving recognition as a poet, a novelist and a writer of short stories. In 2003 he was nominated as one of the best young writers in Britain by the Times Literary Supplement. In 2004 he was selected as one of the country's Next Generation poets. His novels have been published worldwide.

Secrecy, revelation and obsession are recurrent themes in Hill's fiction. In Skin, a worker at London Zoo investigates the disappearance of dead animals at the hands of an eerie figure, the Featherman, finally discovering his formalin-drenched lair in Camden Town's derelict stable-yards. In Underground, Casimir's physical explorations of London's subterranea echo his mental rediscovery of a traumatic childhood in Poland. In The Love of Stones, Katharine Sterne devotes her life to a search for a legendary lost jewel, the Three Brethren. The same motifs are used to powerful effect in The Hidden, and indeed the novel is prefaced with a quotation from John Dalberg-Acton, 1st Baron Acton: "Every thing secret degenerates".

Awards, residencies and associations
Hill has held writing residencies at Newnham College, Cambridge, Sussex University, and Eton College. In 1999 he was the inaugural Poet in Residence at London Zoo. In 2009 he became inaugural Programme Director of the Faber Academy. In 2012 he was appointed as senior lecturer on the MA Creative Writing Course at Oxford Brookes University.

His awards include an Eric Gregory Award in 1995, the Ian St James Award in 1997, and the Pen/Macmillan Silver Pen Award in 1997. He was shortlisted for the Mail on Sunday/John Llewellyn Rhys Prize in 2002 and 2004, and for the Sunday Times Young Writer of the Year Award in 2004.

BibliographyYear of the Dog, National Poetry Foundation, 1995Midnight in the City of Clocks, Oxford University Press, 1996Skin, Faber and Faber, 1997Zoo, Oxford University Press, 1998Underground, Faber and Faber, 1999The Love of Stones, Faber and Faber, 2001The Cryptographer, Faber and Faber, 2003Nocturne in Chrome & Sunset Yellow, Salt Publishing, 2006The Lion Who Ate Everything, Walker, 2008The Hidden, Faber and Faber, 2009What Was Promised, Bloomsbury, 2014

Notes

External links
 Faber profile
 Poetry Society profile
 A review of Hill's The Hidden from "The Oxonian Review" (accessed 26 February 2009)
 British Council: Contemporary Writers website – Tobias Hill (with portrait and critical perspective) (accessed 19 March 2008)
 Guardian articles by Hill
 Review of The HIdden. Salon'' magazine 1 November 2009

1970 births
Living people
English male poets
21st-century English novelists
Alumni of the University of Sussex
Fellows of Newnham College, Cambridge
Fellows of the Royal Society of Literature
People from Cricklewood
People from the London Borough of Camden
English male novelists
21st-century English male writers